Transtillaspis cothurnata is a species of moth of the family Tortricidae. It is found in Napo Province, Ecuador.

The wingspan is 18.5 mm. The ground colour of the forewings is ferruginous creamy, suffused with pale brownish ochreous, with similar brownish strigulae (fine streaks) and brownish costal spots. The markings are ferruginous brownish. The hindwings are creamy grey with grey strigulation.

Etymology
The species name refers to the shape of the sacculus which is in the shape of a cothurnus, which is a shoe with a large heel.

References

Moths described in 2005
Transtillaspis
Moths of South America
Taxa named by Józef Razowski